Jordi Murphy (born 22 April 1991) is an Irish international rugby player. He plays for provincial and United Rugby Championship side Ulster as a loose forward, and also plays for the Ireland national rugby union team.

Early life 
Murphy was born in Barcelona to Irish parents, Conor Murphy and Nicola Carroll. He was named after Catalonia's patron saint St. Jordi, a decision which was influenced by the nurses on duty the night of his birth as the following day was the St Jordi's Day festival. Murphy moved to Dublin at the age of nine where he attended Willow Park primary school.

Murphy played rugby with Blackrock and was part of a successful junior side which won the Leinster Schools Junior Cup in 2006 against Gonzaga College. He later went on to captain the senior side who won the Leinster Senior Cup in 2009. Blackrock triumphed over Terenure in the final with an 18–9 victory making it their 66th senior title.

Professional

Murphy was part of the Leinster Academy and played for Leinster A on 18 occasions representing them in British and Irish Cup and against the other three provinces.

At the beginning of the 2011–12 Pro 12 League season Leinster had 14 players unavailable for selection as they were representing Ireland in the 2011 Rugby World Cup. With a depleted squad and some impressive displays this led to Murphy getting his first senior appearance in their third game of the season. The match was a 19–23 home defeat against Scottish side Glasgow Warriors with Murphy coming on as substitute in the 45th minute replacing Dominic Ryan. In the following league match on 24 September 2011 he made his first competitive start for Leinster in 15–10 away victory against Scarlets in which Fijian Isa Nacewa scored all of the Leinster points. The match was Scarlets 5000th game in the region's 139-year history.

Murphy scored his first try for the province against Cardiff Blues in a nine try victory. In the same match he also picked up the man-of-the-match award. On 15 December 2012, he made his Heineken Cup debut late on against Clermont Auvergne, replacing injured team-mate Shane Jennings. Towards the end of the season he was named Powerade Young Player of the Year at Leinster Rugby's Annual Awards Ceremony held at the Mansion House in Dublin. Only a matter of days later Murphy captained Leinster 'A'  to victory over Newcastle Falcons in the final of the British and Irish Cup.

Murphy moved to Ulster for the 2018–2019 season. In his first season with the province he made 18 appearances and 227 tackles, with a 94% tackle success rate. He made 16 appearances in 2019–2020. He sustained in injury in May 2021 during a Pro14 Rainbow Cup match against Munster, which kept him out until February 2022.

International
Murphy represented Ireland at Under-18, Under-19 and Under-20 levels. In the summer of 2013 Murphy was selected for an Emerging Ireland squad for the 2013 IRB Tbilisi Cup. He went on to play in all three matches against Georgia, South Africa President's XV and Uruguay. Ireland ended the competition as runners-up with Murphy providing an assist in the final match for a Niall Annett try.

He gained his first senior cap for Ireland as a second-half replacement against England at Twickenham in the 2014 RBS 6 Nations on 22 February 2014, winning further caps that year against Italy (8 March) and Argentina (7 June and 14 June). He was a member of Ireland's successful 2015 Six Nations squad, starting in two test matches (Italy, England) and coming on as a replacement against France, Wales and Scotland during that campaign. In September 2015 he was selected as a member of the 31-man Ireland squad for the 2015 Rugby World Cup.

Murphy scored Ireland's first try in the historic 40–29 defeat of New Zealand — then back-to-back world champions — on 5 November 2016 at Soldier Field, Chicago, but was stretchered off later in the game with what proved to be an ACL injury to his left knee.

Despite returning to the national team, scoring a try in the final warm-up game (against Italy) prior to the 2019 Rugby World Cup, coach Joe Schmidt did not select Murphy as part of the squad for Japan, opting instead to fill the final back-row slot with Murphy's former Leinster teammate, Rhys Ruddock. However he was subsequently drafted into the squad, arriving in Japan on 29 September, following the broken foot that Jack Conan suffered in training.
 Murphy slotted straight into the No. 8 role for Ireland's 35–0 win over Russia, but was taken off after 27 minutes, with Ireland up 14–0, following a dislocated rib, and was replaced by CJ Stander.

Personal life
Murphy studied business at Dublin Institute of Technology. In 2009 he received Blackrock's sports personality of the year award presented to him by Ireland captain Brian O'Driscoll. He is the grandson of Irish Olympian, Noel Carroll. Murphy became a father with the birth of his daughter, Lily, on 11 December 2020.

Career statistics
.

Honours
Schoolboys
 Leinster Schools Junior Cup (1): 2006
 Leinster Schools Rugby Senior Cup (1): 2009

Ireland under–20
Six Nations Under 20s Championship (1): 2010

Leinster
 British and Irish Cup (1): 2012–13
 Pro14 (3): 2012–13, 2013–14, 2017–2018
 European Rugby Champions Cup (1): 2017–2018

Ireland
Six Nations (3): 2014, 2015, 2018

Individual
 Leinster Young Player of the Year (1): 2012–13
 Pro14 Dream Team (1): 2013–14

References

External links 
Ulster Rugby profile
United Rugby Championship profile

Ireland profile
Leinster profile
ESPNscrum profile
IRB profile
ItsRugby profile

1991 births
Living people
Sportspeople from Barcelona
Rugby union players from Catalonia
Rugby union flankers
Ireland international rugby union players
Leinster Rugby players
Blackrock College RFC players
Lansdowne Football Club players
Ireland Wolfhounds international rugby union players
People educated at Blackrock College
Ulster Rugby players
Irish rugby union players
Rugby union number eights